Ras-like protein family member 11B is a protein that in humans is encoded by the RASL11B gene.

References

Further reading